Tonga competed at the 2016 Summer Olympics in Rio de Janeiro, Brazil, from 5 to 21 August 2016. This is the nation's ninth consecutive appearance at the Summer Olympics.

Tonga Sports Association and National Olympic Committee sent the nation's largest delegation to the Games since its official debut at the 1984 Summer Olympics in Los Angeles. A total of seven athletes, four men and three women, were selected to the Tongan team across four different sports; four of them granted universality places to compete in their respective sporting events, with the other three qualifying for the Games on merit through continental tournaments.

Breaststroke swimmer Amini Fonua was the only Tongan athlete to have represented at the previous Games, with the rest of the field making their Olympic debut in Rio de Janeiro. Tonga's first ever taekwondo fighter and oldest competitor (aged 32) at the Olympics, Pita Taufatofua, who led his delegation as the flag bearer in the opening ceremony, instantly became an internet sensation by millions of viewers, when he marched into the Maracana Stadium shirtless, smothered in coconut oil, and dressed in a traditional ta'ovala (a Tongan mat).

Tonga, however, failed to win its first Olympic medal since the 1996 Summer Olympics in Atlanta, where boxer Paea Wolfgramm bagged the silver in the men's super heavyweight division.

Archery
 
One Tongan archer has qualified each for the men's and women's individual recurve at the Olympics with a top two finish at the Oceania Qualification Tournament in Nuku'alofa. This is Tonga's return to the Olympic competition in the sport after a 12-year hiatus.

Athletics

Tonga received universality slots from IAAF to send two athletes (one male and one female) to the Olympics.

Track & road events

Swimming

Tonga has received a Universality invitation from FINA to send two swimmers (one male and one female) to the Olympics.

Taekwondo
 
Tonga entered one athlete into the taekwondo competition for the first time at the Olympics. Pita Taufatofua secured a spot in the men's heavyweight category (+80 kg) by virtue of his top finish at the 2016 Oceania Olympic Qualification Tournament in Port Moresby, Papua New Guinea.

See also
Tonga at the 2018 Winter Olympics

References

External links 
 

Olympics
Nations at the 2016 Summer Olympics
2016